Declan Quill is an Irish Gaelic footballer who played with the Kerry county team and continues to play with the Kerins O'Rahilly's club team in Tralee.  A double All-Ireland Senior Football Championship winner, Quill is noted as a talented, skillful and prolific forward.

Playing career
Quill was a star of Kerry teams in the All-Ireland Minor Football Championship and All-Ireland Under-21 Football Championship.  He first appeared for the Kerry senior team in 2001.  He played in the National Football League, and went on to come off the bench in three All-Ireland Senior Football Championship matches that year.  After Kerry's All-Ireland semi final defeat to Meath.

Quill continued to play with the Kerry panel, having great success in the National League, but never quite establishing himself in the starting line-up for the Championship.  From 2001 to 2005, Declan Quill played in five consecutive All-Ireland Senior Football Championship semi-finals, but never appeared in the final.  He did receive two All-Ireland medals as a substitute.  Frustrated by the apparent lack of  Championship opportunities given to him by management in the light of his League performances, he did not play with Kerry in 2006. He returned 2008.

References 

Year of birth missing (living people)
Living people
Irish schoolteachers
Kerins O'Rahilly's Gaelic footballers
Kerry inter-county Gaelic footballers
People from Tralee